The 1500 metres speed skating event was part of the speed skating at the 1956 Winter Olympics programme. The competition was held on naturally frozen ice on the Lake Misurina. It was held on Monday, 30 January 1956, started at 2 PM and ended at 4:05 PM. Fifty-four speed skaters from 18 nations competed.

Medalists
There was no silver medalist as Soviet competitors Yevgeny Grishin and Yuri Mikhaylov tied for first place. Toivo Salonen from Finland won the bronze medal.

Records
These were the standing world and Olympic records (in minutes) prior to the 1956 Winter Olympics.

(*) The record was set in a high altitude venue (more than 1000 metres above sea level) and on naturally frozen ice.

Skating in the first pair, Toivo Salonen set a new Olympic record with 2:09.4 minutes. Yevgeny Grishin, who skated in the eleventh pair, bettered the world record with 2:08.6 minutes. In the twelfth pair, Yuri Mikhaylov was able to equalize the world record.

Results

Kees Broekman was placed 14th because he was paired up with Bertil Eng and finished behind his opponent.

Pierre Huylebroeck did not finish after a fall.

See also

 1956 Winter Olympics

References

External links
Official Olympic Report
 

Speed skating at the 1956 Winter Olympics